Nguyễn Văn Minh may refer to:

 Nguyễn Văn Minh, general of the Army of the Republic of Vietnam
 Nguyễn Văn Minh (footballer)